The 1972 NCAA University Division football season saw the USC Trojans, coached by John McKay, go undefeated and win the national championship as the unanimous choice of the 50 AP panelists.  Eighth-ranked in the preseason, the Trojans were narrowly voted No. 1 in the first AP poll, and stayed out front for the rest of the year.

Prior to the 1972 season, two programs were elevated to the University Division.  The new programs were Long Beach State and Tampa.  The change brought the total number of programs in the University Division to 121.

During the 20th century, the NCAA had no playoff for the major college football teams in the University Division, which became Division I in 1973 (and Division I-A in 1978). The NCAA Football Guide, however, did note an "unofficial national champion" based on the top ranked teams in the "wire service" (AP and UPI) polls.  The "writers' poll" by Associated Press (AP) was the most popular, followed by the "coaches' poll" by United Press International) (UPI).  Through the 1973 season, the UPI issued its final poll in early December before the bowls, but since 1968 (and 1965) the AP Trophy was withheld until the postseason was completed.  The AP poll in 1972 consisted of the votes of fifty sportswriters, though not all of them voted in every poll. Those who cast votes would give their opinion of the ten best teams. Under a point system of twenty points for first place, nineteen for second, etc., the "overall" ranking was determined.

This season was historically significant because it was the first in which freshmen were eligible to play varsity football in the University Division. The NCAA had historically prohibited freshmen from varsity competition, except during the United States involvement in World War II and the Korean War. In 1968, the NCAA allowed freshman eligibility in the University Division in all sports, except football and basketball, and extended the rule to those sports effective with the 1972–73 academic year.

Rule changes
Kickoffs that land in the end zone untouched by the receivers are blown dead and the ball put in play by the receiving team at their own 20-yard line (touchback).
Official time-outs are called for players who are "obviously injured."  Previously, teams were charged a time-out for an injured player.
Fouls committed by the team not in possession of the ball behind the dead-ball spot are enforced from the dead-ball spot.
Jerseys must be replaced if the numbers are no longer readable. (Tear-aways were popular for backs & receivers, later prohibited)
Mouthpieces are made mandatory starting with the 1973 season.

Conference and program changes

NCAA structure
This was the last season for the "University" and "College" divisions. For the 1973 season, the NCAA created the three-division structure that exists today with teams and conferences designated accordingly:
The University Division became Division I 
The College Division was subdivided into Division II and Division III

Five years later in 1978, Division I was subdivided (for football only) into I-A and I-AA. In 2006, these were renamed Division I FBS and FCS, respectively. Many of the teams and conferences now in FCS (Big Sky, Ohio Valley, SWAC, Yankee) were initially in Division II and moved up to I-AA.

Membership changes

Program changes
 Stanford University officially changed their nickname from Indians to Cardinals in 1972; it became the singular Cardinal in 1982.
 The Gulf South Conference, now in Division II, began football play in 1972.

September
In the preseason poll released on September 4, two-time defending national champion Nebraska Cornhuskers was ranked first, followed by their Big 8 conference rival, Colorado. Next was Ohio State, Arkansas, and Penn State.
On September 9, No. 1 Nebraska lost 20–17 on a late field goal to unranked UCLA at night in Los Angeles and dropped to tenth place.  No. 2 Colorado beat California 20–10. No. 3 Ohio State was idle, and No. 4 Arkansas lost 31–10 to No. 8 USC in Little Rock. No. 5 Penn State had not begun its season but fell to sixth. No. 7 Alabama beat Duke 35–12 in Birmingham and reached the top five, as  did No. 6 Oklahoma, which had not yet played a game but moved up two slots.  In the next poll, USC received 13 first place votes, and Colorado and Oklahoma had 12 apiece, but USC had a narrow lead in points, 779 to Colorado's 769.  The poll was led by No. 1 USC, No. 2 Colorado, No. 3 Ohio State, No. 4 Oklahoma, and No. 5 Alabama.
September 16: No. 1 USC trounced Oregon State 51–6, and No. 2 Colorado was idle. No. 3 Ohio State blanked Iowa 21–0, and No. 4 Oklahoma shut out Utah State 49–0. No. 5 Alabama was idle, and No. 7 Tennessee took its place in the next poll following a 28−21 victory over No. 6 Penn State. The poll featured No. 1 USC, No. 2 Oklahoma, No. 3 Colorado, No. 4 Ohio State, and No. 5 Tennessee.
September 23: No. 1 USC won 55–20 at Illinois, and No. 2 Oklahoma crushed Oregon 68–3. No. 3 Colorado won 38–6 at Minnesota, No. 4 Ohio State was idle, and No. 5 Tennessee beat Wake Forest 45–6.  The next poll featured No. 1 USC, No. 2 Oklahoma, No. 3 Colorado, No. 4 Tennessee, and No. 5 Ohio State.
September 30: No. 1 USC played another Big Ten opponent, beating Michigan State 51–6 at the Coliseum in Los Angeles. No. 2 Oklahoma beat Clemson 52–3, having outscored its first three opponents 169–6.  No. 3 Colorado lost 31–6 at Oklahoma State, and No. 4 Tennessee lost 10–6 to Auburn in Birmingham. No. 5 Ohio State beat North Carolina 29–14.  No. 6 Alabama beat Vanderbilt 48–21, and No. 8 Michigan defeated Tulane 41–7.  The next poll featured No. 1 USC, No. 2 Oklahoma, No. 3 Ohio State, No. 4 Alabama, and No. 5 Michigan.

October
October 7: No. 1 USC won 30–21 at No. 15 Stanford; the nine-point margin of victory would turn out to be the closest of their season. No. 2 Oklahoma was idle, and No. 3 Ohio State won 35–18 at California. No. 4 Alabama won 25–7 at Georgia and No. 5 Michigan beat Navy 35–7. The next poll featured No. 1 USC, No. 2 Oklahoma, No. 3 Alabama, No. 4 Ohio State, and No. 5 Michigan.
October 14: No. 1 USC went back to winning big, 42–14 over California. No. 2 Oklahoma shut out their rival, No. 10 Texas, 27–0 at Dallas. No. 3 Alabama beat Florida 24–7.  No. 4 Ohio State beat Illinois 25–7, and No. 5 Michigan blanked Michigan State 10–0, but dropped to sixth in the next poll. No. 6 Nebraska, which rolled over Missouri 62–0, moved up a spot. The top four remained the same.
October 21: No. 1 USC beat No. 18 Washington 34–7, but No. 2 Oklahoma yielded its first touchdown of the season at No. 9 Colorado, and eventually fell 20–14. No. 3 Alabama won at No. 10 Tennessee 17–10, No. 4 Ohio State won at Wisconsin 28–20, and No. 5 Nebraska won 56–0 at Kansas. No. 6 Michigan won 31–7 at Illinois and returned to the top five. The next poll featured No. 1 USC, No. 2 Alabama, No. 3 Nebraska, No. 4 Ohio State, and No. 5 Michigan.
October 28: No. 1 USC won 18–0 at Oregon, its only shutout in a perfect season.  No. 2 Alabama beat Southern Mississippi 48–11 in Birmingham, and No. 3 Nebraska registered its fourth consecutive shutout, 34–0 at Oklahoma State. The Cornhuskers had outscored their opponents 271–14 after their opening loss, most notably including a 77–7 win at Army. No. 4 Ohio State handled Indiana 44–7, and No. 5 Michigan beat Minnesota 27–19. The next poll featured No. 1 USC, No. 2 Alabama, No. 3 Nebraska, No. 4 Michigan, and No. 5 Ohio State.

November
November 4: No. 1 USC beat Washington State 44–3 in Seattle, and No. 2 Alabama defeated Mississippi State 58–14. No. 3 Nebraska won 33–10 at No. 15 Colorado, No. 4 Michigan won 21–7 at Indiana, and No. 5 Ohio State beat Minnesota 27–19.  The top five remained the same.
November 11: No. 1 USC had the week off. In a matchup of undefeated teams, No. 2 Alabama beat No. 6 LSU 35–21 at Birmingham. No. 3 Nebraska visited Iowa State and played to a 23–23 tie.  No. 4 Michigan won 31–0 at Iowa to extend its record to 9–0.  No. 5 Ohio State lost 19–12 at Michigan State, and No. 7 Oklahoma beat No. 14 Missouri 17–6 to return to the top five. The next poll featured No. 1 USC, No. 2 Alabama, No. 3 Michigan, No. 4 Oklahoma, and No. 5 Nebraska.
November 18: No. 1 USC beat No. 14 UCLA, 24–7, and No. 2 Alabama beat Virginia Tech 52–13. No. 3 Michigan got past Purdue 9–6,  No. 4 Oklahoma won 31–7 at Kansas, and No. 5 Nebraska beat Kansas State 59–7. The top five remained the same.
November 25:  No. 1 USC and No. 2 Alabama were idle, while No. 3 Michigan (10–0) and No. 9 Ohio State (9–1) met at Columbus to determine the Big Ten title and USC's Rose Bowl opponent. In the fourth installment of "The Ten Year War," Ohio State won 14–11. No. 4 Oklahoma returned the favor of last year's Game of the Century by beating No. 5 Nebraska 17–14 on the road in Lincoln. No. 6 Penn State beat visiting Pittsburgh 49–27 to close its regular season at 10–1.  The next poll featured No. 1 USC, No. 2 Alabama, No. 3 Oklahoma, No. 4 Ohio State, and No. 5 Penn State.
December 2: No. 1 USC closed its regular season at home with a 45–23 win over No. 10 Notre Dame to finish at 11–0. No. 2 Alabama (10–0), which had already clinched the SEC championship, hoped to do the same as it met No. 9 Auburn (8–1) in their annual Iron Bowl rivalry game in Birmingham.  Auburn spoiled perfection, beating Alabama 17–16. No. 3 Oklahoma closed its regular season with a 10–1 record and the Big 8 title after a 38–15 win over No. 20 Oklahoma State. No. 4 Ohio State and No. 5 Penn State had both finished their regular seasons.  The final regular season poll featured No. 1 USC, No. 2 Oklahoma, No. 3 Ohio State, No. 4 Alabama, and No. 5 Penn State.

In 1972, only the Rose Bowl (Big Ten vs. Pac-8) and Cotton Bowl (SWC winner) had rigid conference tie-ins.  Thus, Big 8 champion Oklahoma passed up an Orange Bowl invitation to play in the Sugar Bowl against Penn State, while SEC champion Alabama turned down the Sugar to meet No. 7 Texas (which had breezed to the SWC title after its early-season loss to Oklahoma) in the Cotton. For the first time, the Sugar Bowl was played at night on New Year's Eve, rather than New Year's Day afternoon. With two consecutive victories in the Orange Bowl, No. 9 Nebraska was invited to a third against No. 12 Notre Dame.

Conference standings

Bowl games

Major bowls
Sunday, December 31, 1972
''Monday, January 1, 1973

The final AP poll in January was: 1. USC (12–0), 2. Oklahoma (11–1), 3. Texas (10–1), 4. Nebraska (9–2–1),  5. Auburn (10–1)

Other bowls

 Prior to the 1975 season, the Big Ten and Pac-8 conferences allowed only one postseason participant each, for the Rose Bowl.

Heisman Trophy voting
The Heisman Trophy is given to the year's most outstanding player. The Big Eight Conference dominated the Heisman race in 1972, as the top three were from Nebraska and Oklahoma:

Source:

See also
 1972 NCAA University Division football rankings
 1972 College Football All-America Team

References